"Sure Enough" is a single by Canadian country music artist Chris Cummings. Released in 1996, it was the second single from his album Somewhere Inside. The song reached #1 on the RPM Country Tracks chart in August 1996.

Chart performance

Year-end charts

References
Sure Enough Lyrics

1996 singles
Chris Cummings songs
Song recordings produced by Jim Ed Norman
Songs written by Frank Dycus
1996 songs
Songs written by Chris Cummings
Warner Records singles